Dondingalong is a locality in the Kempsey Shire of New South Wales, Australia.

Community facilities

The Dondingalong Bush Fire Brigade was formally established in August 1981 but had existed in some form since 1942.

The Dondingalong Multi-Purpose Centre is located at the Kalateenee Recreational Reserve.

The Dondingalong Off-Road Circuit, operated by the Kempsey Macleay Off Road Club, located off Gowings Hill Road, is a popular racing venue.

The Pipers Creek Grove (also known as Dondingalong Organic Bushfoods) bushfood plantation is located at Dondingalong.

History

Dondingalong Public School opened in 1865, was half-time with Sherwood from 1872 to 1876, closed from 1876 to 1881 and was half-time with Sherwood from 1881 to 1882. It operated as a full-time school from 1882 to 1916, during 1918, and from 1928 until it was closed permanently in 1965.

A postal receiving office at Dondingalong opened on 1 August 1896, became a post office on 1 July 1927, and closed on 30 June 1931.

The former Dondingalong Uniting Church (formerly a Wesleyan and Methodist church) opened in 1892. It has closed and been sold.

Dondingalong was affected by a bushfire on 12 February 2017, which destroyed two homes, seven outbuildings, fencing and stock.

Heritage listings
Dondingalong has a number of heritage-listed sites, including:
 Bonnie Corner Road, Kumbatine National Park: Pipers Creek Lime Kilns

References

 
Localities in New South Wales